CJBZ-FM (93.3 FM) is a radio station broadcasting a hot adult contemporary format. Licensed to Lethbridge, Alberta, it serves the Taber/Lethbridge region. The station is currently owned by the Jim Pattison Group.

The station originally began broadcasting in 1974 as CKTA which operated at 1570 AM, until the station moved to its current frequency 93.3 FM in 2000 as classic rocker CHHK. In 2004 it shifted to adult hits and adopted its current branding and callsign and later to CHR/Top 40 in 2007. CJBZ has since shifted to a hot adult contemporary format.

CJBZ airs American Top 40 with Ryan Seacrest on Saturday evenings at 6 PM and on Sunday mornings at 9 AM.

Previous callsigns
 CKTA (1974-1987, 1993-2000)
 CFEZ (1987-1993)
 CHHK (2000-2004)
 CJBZ (2004–present)

References

External links 
B-93
 
 

Jbz
Jbz
Jbz
Radio stations established in 1974
1974 establishments in Alberta